All Saints Roman Catholic Church is located at 127 Chadduck Ave, Buffalo, New York, in the city's Riverside neighborhood. It is part of the Diocese of Buffalo.

History
Bishop Charles H. Colton sought to establish a new parish in center of growing Buffalo riverside neighborhood. He sought out Rev. Henry Dolan to construct the new parish. In 1911, the original church was built of a wood-frame construction in only 11 days. In March 1913, a fire destroyed the church. 
Shortly after, construction of the parish school building was completed. Without a church building to worship in, the congregation used the basement of the school building.

On October 17, 1937, construction began on the present day colonial style church. The cornerstone was laid on December 27 of 1937, and the church was completed in November 1938. The church can seat a congregation of 840.

All Saints Roman Catholic Church contains a 1923 Wurlitzer Organ that was gift from Ellsworth Statler. The organ was originally installed in the Statler Hotel golden ballroom in downtown Buffalo. On June 1 of 1938, the church acquired and installed the organ in their parish. The organ was later rebuilt in 1991.

Gallery

References

Christian organizations established in 1911
Roman Catholic churches in Buffalo, New York